Kneißl or Kneissl is a German-language surname. It may refer to:
Franz Kneissl (1921–1994), Austrian bobsledder 
Karin Kneissl (1965), Austrian diplomat, journalist and independent politician
Mathias Kneißl (1875–1902), German outlaw, poacher and popular social rebel
Michael Kneissl (1966), German physicist 
Sebastian Kneißl (1983), German former professional footballer

References 

German-language surnames
Surnames of Austrian origin